S. Howard Atha House is a national historic site located at 1101 West Princeton Street, Orlando, Florida in Orange County.

It was added to the National Register of Historic Places in 2009.

References

National Register of Historic Places in Orange County, Florida
Buildings and structures in Orlando, Florida
Houses completed in 1928